André Deschamps (born August 13, 1953) is a Canadian former professional ice hockey forward. He was drafted by the Quebec Nordiques of the World Hockey Association in the seventh round, 81st overall, of the 1973 WHA Amateur Draft. He played nine games in the WHA with the Calgary Cowboys in the 1976–77 season, scoring one goal and two assists.

Deschamps was also drafted by the Buffalo Sabres of the National Hockey League in the third round, 44th overall, of the 1973 NHL Entry Draft; however, he never played in that league.

External links

1953 births
Buffalo Sabres draft picks
Calgary Cowboys players
Canadian ice hockey forwards
Charlotte Checkers (SHL) players
Cincinnati Swords players
Erie Blades players
French Quebecers
Hershey Bears players
Ice hockey people from Quebec
Living people
Sportspeople from Salaberry-de-Valleyfield
Quebec Nordiques (WHA) draft picks
Quebec Remparts players
Tidewater Sharks players
Trois-Rivières Ducs players

References